The Saarland Trofeo, formerly the Trofeo Karlsberg, is a junior multi-day cycling race held annually in Germany. It is part of the UCI Junior Nations' Cup.

Winners

References

Cycle races in Germany
Recurring sporting events established in 1988
1988 establishments in Germany